Five ships of the Royal Navy have been named HMS Herald:

  was an 18-gun ship sloop launched in 1806, re-classed as a 20-gun sixth rate in 1810 and 24-gun in 1817, and broken up in 1817.
  was a 500-ton, 28-gun sixth-rate, launched as HMS Termagant in 1822 and renamed in 1824. She served as a survey ship under Henry Kellett and Henry Mangles Denham and was sold in 1864.
  was a paddle river gunboat launched in 1890 and sold in 1903.
She was scuttled in 1942 at Seletar, Singapore Naval Base, raised by the Japanese, renamed Heiyo, and sunk by a mine on 14 November 1944.
  was a hydrographic survey ship launched in 1973 and sold in 2001.

References
 

Royal Navy ship names